Kim Ran-kyung (born 16 December 1992) is a South Korean professional golfer who played on the LPGA of Korea Tour.

References

External links

South Korean female golfers
LPGA of Korea Tour golfers
1992 births
Living people
Place of birth missing (living people)